Adam Cockie (born 18 April 1989) is a former professional Australian rules footballer. He played with the West Coast Eagles in the Australian Football League (AFL) from 2009 to 2010.

Football career 
Cockie made his senior football debut for Subiaco in the West Australian Football League (WAFL) in the opening round of the 2008 season and went on to play in every game, including their third successive grand final victory. That year, he also represented Western Australia against Queensland in Townsville.

Cockie was drafted by the West Coast Eagles with the 18th pick (second round) in the 2009 AFL Rookie draft, and was soon elevated from the rookie list to make his debut against Fremantle in Round 6, 2009. He played four games before being demoted back to the rookie list to make way for the return of Luke Shuey from injury. He was de-listed by West Coast at the end of the 2010 season.

Cockie spent the 2011 season playing for his former team, Subiaco, in the WAFL, before moving to Victoria to play for Victorian Football League (VFL) side, Sandringham in 2012.

After four seasons in the VFL, Cockie re-joined Subiaco for the 2016 season.

Other activities
Cockie has worked as a diversity community officer with the West Australian Football Commission (WAFC) and as Aboriginal project officer with the Western Australian Cricket Association (WACA).

References

External links

Adam Cockie at wafl.com.au

1989 births
Living people
West Coast Eagles players
Subiaco Football Club players
Australian rules footballers from Western Australia
Sandringham Football Club players
Indigenous Australian players of Australian rules football